Olga Lesle Symes  (22 August 1925 – 30 January 1982) was an Australian librarian. Symes was born in Chatswood, New South Wales  in 1925. The daughter of Olive Gertrude and Hessel Alexander Muldoon (a railway clerk), Symes graduated from Hornsby Girls' High School in 1942 and soon joined the Public Library of New South Wales as a junior library assistant. She was an associate of the Australian Society of Accountants, and a fellow of the LAA, and she was appointed MBE in 1970 for her contributions to Australian libraries. Symes died on the 30 January 1982 in Sydney.

References

1925 births
1982 deaths
Australian librarians
Australian Members of the Order of the British Empire
Australian women librarians
20th-century Australian women